John Edwin Fulton (1869–1945) was a Seventh-day Adventist minister, missionary, and administrator. In 1896, Fulton went as a missionary to Fiji where he and his family helped to establish an Adventist presence in that country.
He also served briefly as chair of the Ellen G. White estate board of trustees.

Fulton College in Fiji and the Fulton Memorial Library at La Sierra University are named after Fulton.

References

Seventh-day Adventist religious workers
Ellen G. White Estate
American Seventh-day Adventists
American Seventh-day Adventist ministers
Seventh-day Adventist administrators
American Seventh-day Adventist missionaries
History of the Seventh-day Adventist Church
1869 births
1945 deaths
Seventh-day Adventist missionaries in Fiji
American expatriates in Fiji